Gordon Corera (born 1974) is a British author and journalist. He is the BBC's Security Correspondent and specializes in computer technology.

Early life
Corera was born in London; his father was from the state of Tamil Nadu in southern India and his mother is German. The family has a home near Cavelossim, in the state of Goa in western India, which he says he has a deep affection for, and visits regularly.

Education
Corera was educated at University College School, an independent school for boys in Hampstead in northwest London, followed by St Peter's College at the University of Oxford, where he studied Modern History, followed by graduate studies in US foreign policy at Harvard University.

Life and career
Corera worked on the re-election campaign of President Bill Clinton. He joined the BBC in 1997 as a researcher and later became a reporter.  He has worked on Radio 4's The World Tonight, BBC2's Newsnight, and worked in the US as the BBC's State Department correspondent and as an analyst for the BBC's coverage of the 2000 US presidential election. In 2001 he became the foreign reporter for Radio 4's Today programme.  He was appointed BBC News' security correspondent in 2004.

Corera presented the 2009 Radio 4 programme MI6: A Century in the Shadows, a three-part history of Britain's Secret Intelligence Service.

Books
Corera wrote The Art of Betrayal: Life and Death in the British Secret Service (Orion 2011) about MI6, and Shopping for Bombs: Nuclear Proliferation, Global Insecurity, and the Rise and Fall of the A.Q. Khan Network (September 2006) , about Abdul Qadeer Khan and Pakistan's nuclear programme.

He wrote Intercept: The Secret History of Computers and Spies, also Cyberspies: The Secret History of Surveillance, Hacking, and Digital Espionage.

Corera wrote the introduction to Omar Nasiri's book Inside the Jihad: My Life with al Qaeda, a Spy's story.

Corera most recently wrote Russians Among Us: Sleeper Cells, Ghost Stories and the Hunt for Putins Spies. The book covers the FBI and CIA investigation into the Russian Illegals programs.

References

External links
 Audio discussion with Gordon Corera, ABC New South Wales, Australia
Journalisted - Articles by Gordon Corera

Living people
Alumni of St Peter's College, Oxford
BBC newsreaders and journalists
British male journalists
People educated at University College School
Harvard University alumni
1974 births
British people of Tamil descent
British people of Portuguese descent